Nalle Colt is a Swedish guitarist and resident studio musician, best known as the lead guitarist in the Los Angeles based rhythm & blues band, Vintage Trouble. Colt was born in Malmö, Sweden. As a child, he was a skateboarding prodigy, competing on a professional level. After an injury left him bed-ridden, he learned to play guitar at the age of 13. Colt cites his early musical influences as The Beatles, Jimi Hendrix, and Led Zeppelin.

Music career

Colt played with Ty Taylor in the band Ghosthounds before forming Vintage Trouble with Rick Barrio Dill and Richard Danielson in 2010.

Vintage Trouble has supported artists including Joss Stone, Paloma Faith, the Dixie Chicks, The Who, Lenny Kravitz, Bon Jovi, and AC/DC on their 2015 Rock or Bust World Tour.

Colt has also played with 2 Cent Penny, 6 Foot Nurse

Discography
2019 Chapter II - EP II / Vintage Trouble / Guitar, Vocals
2018 Chapter II - EP I / Vintage Trouble / Guitar, Vocals
2015 1 Hopeful Rd. / Vintage Trouble / Guitar, Vocals 
2014 The Swing House Acoustic Sessions / Vintage Trouble / Guitar, Vocals
2013 Sound the Alarm / Booker T. Jones / Composer, Guitar
2011 The Bomb Shelter Sessions / Vintage Trouble Composer, Group Member, Guitars, Vocals
2010 Little Immaculate White Fox / Pearl Aday / Composer, Guitar, Lyricist
2007 The Winding Road / Engelbert Humperdinck / Guitar (Electric)

Equipment

Colt is endorsed by Fender Guitars, Taylor Guitars, D'Addario, Schaffer Replica-Solo Dallas, Lazy J Amplifier, Mogami Cable and Clayton Guitar Picks.

References

Living people
Swedish rhythm and blues musicians
Musicians from Malmö
Year of birth missing (living people)
Vintage Trouble members